Silver Grove may refer to:

Places 
 Silver Grove, Kentucky
 Silver Grove, Tennessee
 Silver Grove, West Virginia

See also 
 Silver Grove School (Kentucky), secondary school located in Silver Grove, Kentucky
 Silver Grove Independent Schools, school district located in Silver Grove, Kentucky